Covisint was an American information technology company that was purchased by OpenText, a Canadian company for US$103 million in July, 2017. The OpenText Business Network mission is "Integrate, manage and securely exchange data across people, systems and things to gain an information advantage".

The roots of Covisint were in a program funded by General Motors to simplify supply chain led by Phil Abraham. General Motors was joined by Ford, and DaimlerChrysler to create a single B2B Supplier Exchange in 2000. They were also joined by Nissan, Renault and Peugeot as participants. In February 2004, Compuware Corporation acquired Covisint.  Compuware completed a spin-off of Covisint on October 31, 2014. Covisint was fully independent of Compuware until its purchase by OpenText.

Initially focused in the automotive industry, they have expanded into the healthcare, oil and gas, government, and financial services. Covisint has offices in Southfield, San Francisco, Shanghai, Coventry and Frankfurt.

References

External links
 Official site

Software companies based in Michigan
Companies based in Southfield, Michigan
Software companies established in 2000
Companies formerly listed on the Nasdaq
2013 initial public offerings
2017 mergers and acquisitions
Corporate spin-offs
American subsidiaries of foreign companies
Defunct software companies of the United States